Miramar Rangers AFC is an amateur New Zealand association football club in the Wellington suburb of Miramar. The club is one of the most successful in New Zealand having won the Chatham Cup four times and the National League title twice. Over the last decade the club has played in the Central League and has won the division seven times, most recently in 2020.

In 2004 it became one of the founding principal clubs of the Team Wellington franchise in the ASB Premiership.

Club history
Miramar won the Chatham Cup, New Zealand's premier knockout tournaments for men, in 1966, 1992, 2004 and 2010, and were Central League winners in 1997, 2006, 2008, 2011, 2013, 2014 and 2020.  Miramar also won the now-defunct club National League in 2002 and 2003; the latter was the final National League season before it was revived again in 2021, which Miramar have since qualified for the Championship phase.

Oceania Footballer of the Century Wynton Rufer played 8 games for the club in the 1982 season.

Stadium
 	
Miramar Rangers play all their home games at David Farrington Park in Miramar.

Current squad

Coaching and medical staff

Major Honours
 New Zealand National Soccer League/New Zealand National League
Champions (3): 2002, 2003, 2021
Premiers (1): 2021
  Central League winners 
Champions (7): 1997, 2006, 2008, 2011, 2013, 2014, 2020
 Chatham Cup
Winners (4): 1966, 1992, 2004, 2010

League Records

Most Appearances:
Stu Jacobs - 220 (1984–2000)
David Chote - 209 (1983–1997)
Peter Chote - 158 (1981–1987)
Bobby Peel - 122 (1986–1992)
Mark Cummings - 110 (1981–1991)
Costa Leonidas - 106 (1981–1989)
Brent Pratt - 105 (1981–1989)

Most Goals:
David Chote - 68 (1983–1997)
Graham Little - 48 (2001–2003)
John Murphy - 48 (1991–1998)

Biggest Win
13-0 v Wellington United 2019

Biggest Defeat
0-8 v Christchurch United 1988
0-8 v Lower Hutt City 1996
0-8 v Wanganui East Athletic 1996

Most Goals in a Season
 22 - John Murphy, 1991

Notable former players

Justin Fashanu (1997)
Phil Alexander (1983–1985)
Tim Brown (1995–2000)
Vaughan Coveny (1991–1992)
Tom Doyle (2012)
Malcolm Dunford (1990)
Simon Elliott (1996–1997)
Henry Fa'arodo (2011–2012)
Raf de Gregorio (2005–2008)
Justin Gulley (2011–2014, 2016–)
Chris Killen (1995–1998)
Wynton Rufer (1982)
Grant Turner (1986)
Barry Pickering (1982–1986)
Michael Utting (1992, 1994–1996)
Julie Harvey (?)

References

External links
Official club website

Association football clubs in Wellington
Sport in Wellington City
Association football clubs established in 1907
1907 establishments in New Zealand